The City–County Building is a 28-story building at 200 East Washington Street in downtown Indianapolis, Indiana, that houses the offices of the consolidated city-county government of Indianapolis and Marion County, Indiana, known as Unigov.

History
The building opened in 1962 after two years of construction, at a cost of $22 million. The City-County Building was the first building in the city to be taller than the Soldiers' and Sailors' Monument, and was the tallest building in the city until 1970.

Prior to its construction, Marion County offices were located in the Marion County Courthouse, which stood on what is now Richard G. Lugar Plaza on the south side of the City–County Building; the courthouse was demolished upon completion of the latter. Indianapolis city offices were located in the Indianapolis City Hall.

Usage
The City–County Building houses the Marion County Courts, headquarters of the Indianapolis Metropolitan Police Department, and the Indianapolis City-County Council. The office of the Mayor of Indianapolis is on the twenty-fifth floor of the building. An observation deck, open to the public, is accessible on the twenty-eighth floor of the building.

Proposal to sell to private sector
In 2017, the city began the process to build a new criminal justice complex in the Twin Aire neighborhood that opened in 2022. As a result, there will be a large amount of empty space in the City-County Building. In 2018, the administration of Mayor Joe Hogsett began a process to determine how much office space the city-county government will require in the future, and where it should be located. One possibility is to sell the CCB to private developers and move some of the government offices to the Old Indianapolis City Hall. "Our offices struggle to reorganize around modern technology," Hogsett said. "Many of our offices are sized with the assumption records will be kept in rows and rows of filing cabinets. Why not? That's how they kept the records in 1960. That's how the (City-County Building) was built."

See also
Government of Indianapolis
List of tallest buildings in Indianapolis
List of tallest buildings in Indiana

References

External links

City-County Building at SkyscraperPage

Skyscraper office buildings in Indianapolis
Government of Indianapolis
Government buildings completed in 1962
Headquarters in the United States
County government buildings in Indiana
1962 establishments in Indiana